Vitaliy Sidorov (born March 23, 1970 in Khichauri, Georgian SSR, Soviet Union) is a retired discus thrower, who represented Ukraine (1996) and later Russia (2000) at the Summer Olympics.

He set his personal best (67.90 m) in the men's discus throw on May 3, 1998 at a meet in Kyiv. Sidorov also competed in the men's shot put. Sidorov adopted the Russian nationality on February 12, 2000

Achievements

External links 

1970 births
Living people
People from Adjara
Ukrainian male shot putters
Russian male discus throwers
Ukrainian male discus throwers
Athletes (track and field) at the 1996 Summer Olympics
Athletes (track and field) at the 2000 Summer Olympics
Olympic athletes of Russia
Olympic athletes of Ukraine
Universiade medalists in athletics (track and field)
Universiade gold medalists for Ukraine
Medalists at the 1995 Summer Universiade